The 2014 UConn Huskies football team represented the University of Connecticut in the 2014 NCAA Division I FBS football season as a member of the American Athletic Conference. They played their home games at Rentschler Field. They were led by first year head coach Bob Diaco. They finished the season 2–10, 1–7 in AAC play to finish in a tie for tenth place.

Schedule

Schedule Source:

Game summaries

BYU

Stony Brook

Boise State

South Florida

Temple

Tulane

East Carolina

UCF

Army

Cincinnati

Memphis

SMU

References

UConn
UConn Huskies football seasons
UConn Huskies football